Chogaram Bakolia as an Indian politician. He was former cabinet minister of Transport in Government of Rajasthan. He is a MLA from Reodar constituency Rajasthan. leader of Indian National Congress

References

1944 births
Living people
People from Sirohi district
Members of the Rajasthan Legislative Assembly
Place of birth missing (living people)
Indian National Congress politicians from Rajasthan